Jean Lauk (15 September 1918 – 15 October 1966) was a French racing cyclist. He rode in the 1948 Tour de France.

References

External links

1918 births
1966 deaths
French male cyclists
Cyclists from Paris